Roger Joseph Vangheluwe (born 7 November 1936) is the former Bishop of Bruges. He gained notoriety after admitting to having sexually abused two nephews over the course of a 15-year period while serving first as a priest and then as bishop, though the admission came after the statute of limitations for the crimes had expired, leaving him beyond the reach of state prosecution.

Life
Roger Vangheluwe was born on 7 November 1936 at Roeselare and studied Christian theology and mathematics. He was ordained in February 1963. He was appointed as Bishop of Bruges on 15 December 1984 by Pope John Paul II. He was consecrated on 3 February 1985 by Cardinal Godfried Danneels.

Resignation following sexual abuse scandal

Resignation

On 23 April 2010 Pope Benedict XVI accepted Vangheluwe's resignation after his admission that he had repeatedly sexually abused his nephew for 13 years, starting when the boy was just 5 years old. The abuse began when Vangheluwe was a priest and continued after he was made a bishop. His is the first episcopal resignation in Belgium relating to the sexual abuse of minors.

Vangheluwe's resignation was announced at a press conference by Archbishop Andre-Joseph Leonard. Leonard said that Vangheluwe's resignation shows that the Catholic Church in Belgium wants to "turn over a leaf from a not very distant past."

Pre-scandal public statements on pedophilia

When asked during a university lecture on 19 April 2010 how pedophilia should best be discussed in class, Vangheluwe replied: "I think you need to be well informed about these things. In a way, it's not a tougher subject than many others. Yes, it's embarrassing, it's scandalous. But then again, so are many other things [...] Also, there have been some articles that imply that pedophilia is nowhere so little prevalent as in the Church [...]".

As late as 21 April 2010, Vangheluwe had written a column in a regional edition of the Flemish Catholic weekly Kerk en Leven ("Church and Life"), saying that "at present we suffer from the scandals that batter the Church: everywhere there are stories of priests abusing children. It's horrible to see these things surface, and they hurt us deeply. Nevertheless, this shouldn't blind us from the fact that the majority of priests lead exemplary lives and represent a support to many. (...) They aspire to imitate Jesus."

Retirement

On 26 April 2010, it was reported that Vangheluwe had retired to Westvleteren Abbey with a state pension of about US$3,600 a month.

On 12 September 2010, the Huffington Post reported that Vangheluwe would immediately leave the abbey and had stated that "as of today, I will contemplate my life and future somewhere hidden, outside the bishopry of Bruges."

On 4 April 2011, the Reuters news service reported that prosecution of Vangheluwe is not possible because the crimes occurred too long ago.

On 12 April 2011, it was announced that the Congregation for the Doctrine of the Faith ruled that Vangheluwe had to leave Belgium and undergo spiritual and psychological treatment. The statement said that "he is not allowed any public exercise of priestly and episcopal ministry. The psychological treatment is provided by the Congregation to obtain additional information useful for diagnosis and prognosis, to come to a final decision, which remains the responsibility of the congregation itself, and to be approved by the Holy Father (i.e., the Pope). This decision will of course take into account the different aspects of the issue, beginning with the suffering of the victims and the needs of justice. The process is still ongoing and therefore the decision taken so far by the Congregation is interlocutor and not final."

On 14 April 2011, Vangheluwe gave an interview to Flemish TV-station VT4. In the interview, he admitted to abusing another nephew. He also stated that he did not see himself as a pedophile. The interview caused indignation in Belgium. On 24 April 2011 (Easter), Archbishop André-Joseph Léonard strongly condemned the interview, stating it was "bad timing" because the Vatican had insisted that Vangheluwe remain silent. Leonard further called the interview "shocking".

In the theatre
Vangheluwe features as a main character in Bruges (Edinburgh Festival 2014), a play in The Europeans Trilogy (Bruges, Antwerp, Tervuren) by UK playwright Nick Awde.

References

1936 births
Living people
20th-century Roman Catholic bishops in Belgium
21st-century Roman Catholic bishops in Belgium
Bishops of Bruges
Catholic Church sexual abuse scandals in Europe
People from West Flanders
Scandals in Belgium
Religious controversies in Belgium
Sex scandals